Vittorio Algarotti (1533-1604), was born in Verona and was president of the Verona College of Medicine from 1593 through his death in 1604. A contemporary of Paracelsus, he introduced the use of antimony oxychloride, which he referred to as pulveris angelicus (powder of the angels) to medicine.

References

1533 births
1604 deaths
Physicians from Verona
16th-century Italian physicians
Italian academic administrators
Heads of universities in Italy